Anonymous;Code is a visual novel video game developed by Mages and Chiyomaru Studio, and is the sixth mainline entry in the Science Adventure series. Following a series of delays, the game was released for PlayStation 4 and Nintendo Switch on July 28, 2022 in Japan. The PlayStation Vita version was announced but has since been cancelled. A western English release, published by Spike Chunsoft, was announced in July 2022 and adds a Windows version to the list of platforms. It is scheduled for 2023.

Plot 
In the year 2036, the Sad Morning disaster occurs, where an incident involving computers leads to the destruction of major cities around the world. A similar event is expected to take place in 2038, so a supercomputer called GAIA is used to create an alternate Earth using an Earth Simulator in order to study the possible effects of the impending catastrophe. The experiment was initially inconclusive because of the possibility of low birth rates in the alternate Earth, so a message called the Arecibo Message was used to allow humans to live there. However, humanity in the alternate Earth then creates their own Earth Simulator which leads to questions about the original Earth's existence. The game takes place in 2037. The protagonist, a hacker named Pollon Takaoka, has an ability which allows him to save and load moments, much like save features in video games.

Development 
Anonymous;Code was developed by Chiyomaru Studio and Mages, and was written by Naotaka Hayashi, Ayano Suehiro, and Tsukasa Tsuchiya. Alongside Occultic;Nine, it was initially announced as part of the Science Visual Novel series, intended to be separate from the developers' Science Adventure series. However, both games were later incorporated into the Science Adventure series, with Occultic;Nine and Anonymous;Code serving as the fifth and sixth main entries in the franchise respectively. In contrast with the concept of infinitely expanding horizontal "world lines" used in Shikura's Science Adventure game Steins;Gate, Anonymous;Code uses the concept of infinitely expanding vertical "world layers", with the main character being able to manipulate layers below his, and is themed around hacking. According to Shikura, the game's role is in part resolving unanswered questions from the Science Adventure series.

Shikura stated that he initially wanted to increase the game's immersion by applying a unique artwork to every scene and using full animation during  major events. However, he realised the game would need at least 3000 pieces of artwork (in contrast to the usual 100 found in visual novels), not counting the costs to produce the animations, and thus discarded this idea. His research on how to lower the costs of an immersive visual novel led him to consider reusing old animation, developing Steins;Gate Elite from this idea.

Release 
The game was released for the PlayStation 4 and Nintendo Switch in Japan on July 28, 2022, after numerous delays since 2016. A PlayStation Vita version was initially announced, but was cancelled due to the system's discontinuation. An official English language localization was announced on July 2, 2022 and will be published by Spike Chunsoft worldwide sometime in 2023 for PlayStation 4, Nintendo Switch and Windows. This version will have an initial run of limited SteelBook launch editions. Mages has also mentioned that they might develop a PlayStation 5 version.

References

External links 
 
 

Cancelled PlayStation Vita games
Fiction set in 2037
2022 video games
Video games developed in Japan
Visual novels
Video games set in Tokyo
Video games set in the 2030s
Nintendo Switch games
PlayStation 4 games
Science Adventure
Spike Chunsoft video games
Windows games